The SR-25 (Stoner Rifle-25) is a designated marksman rifle and semi-automatic sniper rifle designed by Eugene Stoner and manufactured by Knight's Armament Company.

The SR-25 uses a rotating bolt and a direct impingement gas system. It is loosely based on Stoner's AR-10, rebuilt in its original 7.62×51mm NATO caliber. Up to 60% of parts of the SR-25 are interchangeable with the AR-15 and M16—everything but the upper and lower receivers, the hammer, the barrel assembly and the bolt carrier group. SR-25 barrels were originally manufactured by Remington Arms with its 5R (five grooves, right twist) rifling, with twist 1:11.25. The heavy  barrel is free-floating, so handguards are attached to the front of the receiver and do not touch the barrel.

History
In the late 1950s, Eugene Stoner designed the AR-10 battle rifle to equip U.S. troops. It was accurate for an auto-loading rifle, but it lost the competition to the M14 rifle. The patent rights for the AR-10 and the AR-15 were sold to Colt's Manufacturing Company. Colt focused on the AR-15, giving others the ability to capitalize on the AR-10 system.

In the early 1990s, Stoner joined Knight's Armament Company. He continued his AR-10 design work and joined it with the direct gas system of the AR-15. The result was the SR-25 (adding together the numbers of the AR-10 and AR-15) which improved the AR-10 design with M16A2 advancements and parts commonality. The original SR-25 was released in the early 1990s and had a heavy free-floating  match grade barrel with a fiberglass handguard. It had a flat top upper receiver with a Mil-Std 1913 rail for mounting optics and a 2-stage match grade trigger. The bolt carrier was similar to the AR-10's, being chrome plated and having a captive firing pin retainer pin. The SR-25 was designed specifically to fire  open-tip match cartridges. Accuracy was guaranteed at or under 1 minute of angle. At first, AR-10 type 20-round magazines were used, but they were later replaced by steel 20-round magazines resembling those used by the M16.

United States Special Operations Command took interest in the SR-25, particularly its high magazine capacity and faster engagement time compared to bolt-action rifles. After some modifications, SOCOM adopted the SR-25 as the Mk 11 MOD 0 in May 2000. Changes included a shorter  barrel that could fire M118 and M118LR 7.62×51mm NATO rounds and had a quick detachable sound suppressor mount. An  free-floating handguard rail system allowed mounting accessories. Flip-up front sights and adjustable back-up iron sights were added, and an M16A2 stock and pistol grip were used.

Beginning in mid-2011, SOCOM began divesting the Mk 11 MOD 0 from their inventory and replacing it with the SSR Mk 20, the sniper variant of the FN SCAR. The Mk 11 was completely replaced by 2017.

Design
The SR-25 enhanced match rifle utilizes the newer URX II Picatinny-Weaver rail system, rather than the older Mk 11 free-floating RAS, on the top of the receiver to accept different scope mounts or a carrying handle with iron sights (front sight mounted on the rail located on the forward end of the non-modular handguard).

The Mk 11 MOD 0 system is chambered for 7.62×51mm NATO, and is designed for match-grade ammunition. The Mk 11 system includes the rifle, 20 round box magazines, QD (Quick Detachable) scope rings, Leupold Mark 4 Mil-dot riflescope, Harris swivel-base bipod on a Knight's mount, and QD sound suppressor, which is also manufactured by Knight's Armament Co. Flip-up BUIS (Back up iron sights) are attached to the modified gas block and upper receiver.

The RAS allows for quick attachment/detachment of MIL-STD-1913 components. The aluminum fore-end makes no contact with the barrel forward of the receiver, allowing for improved accuracy.

During the Iraq War, the United States Marine Corps ordered 180 Mk 11 MOD 1 rifles which were Mk 11s equipped with the upper receiver of the M110 Semi-Automatic Sniper System. The M110 upper gave the Mk 11 MOD 1 a URX modular rail system and a flash suppressor on the barrel. These saw limited use before they were phased out when the Marines chose to purchase the Mk 11 MOD 2, which was simply the USSOCOM and U.S. Navy designation for the complete M110 rifle.

The SR-25 Enhanced Match (E.M.) Carbine is very similar to the KAC M110 Semi-Automatic Sniper System, though the M110 utilizes the newer URX Rail system, a length-adjustable fixed buttstock, and an integrated flash suppressor. Starting in late 2011, USMC snipers began to replace Mk 11 MOD 0 rifles with the M110 on a one-for-one basis.

Users

: Australian Army, Royal Australian Air Force Airfield Defence Guards and Police Tactical Groups.
: IDF special forces.
: Philippine National Police Special Action Force, Philippine Army Light Reaction Regiment
: GROM.
: Republic of Korea Navy Special Warfare Flotilla
: Royal Thai Army.
: Gendarmerie General Command
: United States Military

Gallery

See also
 Mk 12 Special Purpose Rifle
 List of individual weapons of the U.S. Armed Forces

References

External links

Knight's Armament Company – SR-25 Series 7.62 mm Rifle
Modern Firearms Site

7.62×51mm NATO firearms
Police weapons
Semi-automatic rifles
Sniper rifles of the United States
United States Marine Corps equipment
ArmaLite AR-10 derivatives
Designated marksman rifles
Military equipment introduced in the 1990s